Sakala Guru is a 2019 Sri Lankan comedy mystery teledrama broadcast on Jathika Rupavahini. The series is directed by Tikiri Ratnayake, produced by Sama Rathnayake for season one and Siddharth Abeywardena for season two. The serial is written by Chinthaka Peiris. The first season was first aired in August 2019 every weekday from Monday to Thursday at 7.30 pm. The season one ended on 1 January 2018 after 202 episodes. The teledrama is being shot in Pussella We-Uda village, Mawathagama in Kurunegala.

In season 1, it stars Giriraj Kaushalya, Mihira Sirithilaka and Chinthaka Peiris in lead roles along with Dilhani Weerasinghe, Chamila Peiris and Susila Kottage in supportive roles. The show becomes a popular serial, where the crew had to make the second season as well.

Second season titled Sakala Guru 2 was started on 5 May 2021. The previous cast reprised their roles from the first season. The series ended after 100 episodes, when the lead actor Giriraj Kaushalya had fallen ill.

Seasons

Plot (Season 1)

Plot (Season 2)

Cast and characters

Main
 Giriraj Kaushalya as Pinsiri Podi Bandara aka Podde Gurunnanse
 Mihira Sirithilaka as Bhoothaya 
 Chinthaka Peiris as Sumane
 Chamila Peiris as Siriyalatha, wife of Podde Gurunnanse
 Dilhani Weerasinghe as Pushpa

Supportive cast
 Kavindya Dulshani as Nelum (retired)
 Taniya Perera as Nelum (current)
 Susila Kottage as Maggy Hami
 Nethalie Nanayakkara as Nona Hami
 Ananda Athukorala as Chandrasiri, Grama Sevaka
 Hansamala Janaki as Kanthi, Grama Sevaka's wife
 Mahinda Pathirage as Kalu Mudalali
 Udaya Kumari as Hamine, Mudalali's wife
 Imeshan Nelligahawatte as Mayura
 Harshi Anjumala as Roshini
 Aloka Dhananjani as Kokila
 Deepani Silva as Hichchi Amma

Minor cast
 Hasarinda Kesara as Amila
 Suneth Shanthapriya as Kumara
 Milinda Perera as Loku Hamuduruwo
 Shashi Angelina as Bhoothi                                     
 Saman Gunawardena as Minister Wanninayake
 Indika Prabath as Kapila
 Anula Wanigasuriya
 Nimesha de Silva as Anoma
 Jagath Jayawardena as Berty
 Daya Wayaman as Ruk Deviya
 Sheshan Manawadu
 Shahini Roshana
 Sanju Kaushalya
 Kandula Seneviratne
 Ayesha Abeyratne
 Anushka Bandara Ketakumbura
 Priyantha Ranasinghe
 Mahesh Jayaweera
 Sujatha Halahakoon
 Chandrani Kulauthum
 Sampath Bandihetti
 Sunethra Abeykoon
 Gamini Chandrasiri
 Lal Hapuarachchi
 Vipulantha Hettiarachchi
 Ananda Manatungarachchi
 Chathura Pramod Rathnayake

Critical response
Initially, the teledrama crew was decided to terminate the serial after two hundred episodes. But due to the large response from the audience, they started the second season of the serial.

References 

Sri Lankan television shows
2019 Sri Lankan television series debuts
2021 Sri Lankan television series endings
Sri Lanka Rupavahini Corporation original programming